Haga was the name of at least two steamships:

, built by Sölvesborgs Skeppsvarf. Sunk in 1940 by enemy action
, built by Flensberger Schiffsbau-Gesellschaft, in service 1938–45

Ship names